Satyameva Jayate is a part of a mantra from the Hindu scripture Mundaka Upanishad. Following the independence of India, it was adopted as the national motto of India on 26 January 1950, the day India became a republic.
It is inscribed in the Devanagari script at the base of the Lion Capital of Ashoka and forms an integral part of the Indian national emblem. The emblem and the words "Satyameva Jayate" are inscribed on one side of all Indian currency and national documents.

Origin
The origin of the motto is the mantra 3.1.6 from the Mundaka Upanishad. The mantra is as follows:

In Devanāgarī script
सत्यमेव जयते नानृतं सत्येन पन्था विततो देवयानः ।
येनाक्रमन्त्यृषयो ह्याप्तकामाम्म् यत्र तत् सत्यस्य परमं निधानम्म् ॥

Transliteration
satyameva jayate nānṛtaṃ
satyena panthā vitato devayānaḥ
yenākramantyṛṣayo hyāptakāmā
yatra tat satyasyaa paramaṃ nidhānamm

In English
Truth alone triumphs; not falsehood.
Through truth the divine path is spread out
by which the sages whose desires have been completely fulfilled,
reach to where is that supreme treasure of Truth.

Popular connotations
Popular connotations also include:
 'Truth stands Invincible'
 'Truth alone conquers, not falsehood'
 'The true prevails, not the untrue'
 'Veritas Vincit', a direct Latin translation. 
 'Truth alone conquers, not untruth'
 'Truth Alone Triumphs, not (na) that against Sacred law (Rta)
 Vaymaiye Vellum (Tamil: வாய்மையே வெல்லும்)

The slogan was popularized and brought into the national lexicon by Pandit Madan Mohan Malaviya in 1918 when serving his second of four terms as president of the Indian National Congress.

See also
List of Indian state mottos, for mottos adopted by individual states of India
Truth prevails, the national motto of Czech Republic that has the same meaning

References

National mottos
National symbols of India
Hindu mantras
Sanskrit mottos
Upanishadic concepts